Blaža is a village in the municipality of Vareš, Bosnia and Herzegovina.

Demographics 
According to the 2013 census, its population was nil, down from 72 in 1991.

References

Populated places in Vareš